City Empiria (original name Motokov building), is a skyscraper in Prague. It is the third tallest building in the Czech Republic at 104 meters. The antenna reaches a height of 132 m. It was opened in 1977 as the headquarters of Czechoslovak trade company Motokov.

In 2001 ECM Real Estate Investments bought the building, and reconstructed it in 2005.
 In 2010 ECM sold the Building for CZK 1.8 billion to Generali PPF Holding.

Gallery

References

External links 
 City Empiria on ECM website
 City Empiria on PPF Real Estate website

Buildings and structures in Prague
Skyscraper office buildings in the Czech Republic
Office buildings completed in 1977
1977 establishments in Czechoslovakia
20th-century architecture in the Czech Republic